FC Otepää is a football club, based in Otepää, Estonia.

Since January 2019, the club acts as a youth team for Tartu JK Tammeka.

Players

Current squad

 ''As of 14 June 2017.

Statistics

League and Cup

References

External links
 Official website 

Association football clubs established in 2004
Valga County
2004 establishments in Estonia
Football clubs in Estonia